GOGOLFEST is an annual multidisciplinary international festival of contemporary art and cinema in Kyiv, Ukraine, dedicated to the famous writer Mykola Gogol. The festival showcases theater, music, film, literature, and visual art.

Background 

GOGOLFEST was founded in 2007 on the private initiative of Vladislav Troitsky, director and producer of the DAKh Center for Contemporary Art. The co-founder of the Festival and Chairman of its Board of Trustees is Evgeni Utkin, a prominent Ukrainian IT entrepreneur. Ukrainian-Russian writer Nikolai Gogol is the festival’s namesake.

In accordance with contemporary trends, the festival is held in venues unaccommodated for traditional art. The festival emphasizes five types of art: theater, music, film, literature, and visual art. There is also a history of collaboration between artistic mediums at the festival; for instance, audiovisual presentations are especially common, as well as collaborations with scientists. (For example, engineers from Lithuania’s Cyland Laboratory have taken part in exhibits.) The festival is generally held in September. For example, the dates for Gogolfest 2013 were September 13 to 22, 2013.

Gogolfest often focuses on short films, though full-length films have also been featured at the festival. The films featured are often international in scope and experimental in subject matter. Previous examples of film series have included “The Long Night of German Shorts,” a selection of critically acclaimed films from Germany. Theater also has a significant place in the events of Gogolfest, as well as a role in the ongoing re-invention of Ukrainian theater. Troitskiy, in an interview, described Gogolfest as seeking to extract Ukrainian theater from the tradition of Russian theater, so it can “stand on its own.” Indeed, the festival has consistently had specially Ukrainian theater showcases. The festival is, however, committed to artistic diversity and has also produced the plays of Russian, Italian, Spanish, Swiss and Hungarian theatres. Some of the works shown at Gogolfest include “Gloria” a theatrical performance by Ukrainian director Alla Fedoryshyna, which used traditional Ukrainian folk music on the background, and depicted scenes from regular life in Ukraine: birth, marriage and death.

The festival has often included readings from contemporary authors. The festival has also included events to allow patrons access to publishing house representatives. For example, a lecture was given at Gogolfest 2013 by Ukrainian publishing house “Dukh I Litera.” “Dukh i Litera” has published more than 300 books. Most significant were editions of various foreign writers, among others Paul Riceour, Hanna Arendt, Michel de Montaigne, Blaise Pascal, Sergey Averintsev, Charles Taylor, Reinhart Koselleck, Elie Wiesel, as well as Ukrainian authors Ivan Dzyuba, Mykhaylyna Kotsyubyns’ka, Viktor Malakhov, Maryna Novikova, Myron Petrovs’kyi, Vadym Skurativs’kyi, among others.

Gogolfest has a long tradition of visual art. Indeed, the founder of the festival Vladislav Troitsky is Director and Head of the Dakh Contemporary Arts Center, one of the foremost arts exhibition organizations in Kyiv. This tradition likewise includes street art. Examples include street artist duo Roti and Kislow’s mural, created explicitly for the festival.

History

Venues 

The festival uses venues unaccommodated for traditional art. Before 2010, most of its events took place in Kyiv at the Mystetskyi Arsenal Museum - a renovated 18th century fortified arsenal building. The event was held in the Artistic Arsenal in 2007, 2009, and 2010. The Artistic Arsenal was conceived of as the largest and most widespread exhibition venue and museum in Kyiv. This is the official website’s statement on the future and expansion of the venue: “Mystetskyi Arsenal is already negotiating with the leading museums of Ukraine and the world in order to exhibit collections of art masterpieces in Ukraine, among them a big project on the heritage of Kazimir Malevich, international projects on contemporary art, exhibitions of works by Frida Kahlo, Edward Munch, Gustav Klimt, masters of the Austrian Secession, and Surrealist artists.”

In 2010, the festival moved to Dovzhenko Film Studios – named for the Ukrainian director Oleksander Dovzhenko. In 2012, 2013 and 2014, the venue was at the "Artcluster Vydubychi",(formerly the Kyiv Experimental Mechanical Plant), in the Vydubychi industrial area, near the Vydubychi Metro in Kyiv.

References

External links 
 Official Festival website

Music festivals in Ukraine
Culture in Kyiv
Autumn events in Ukraine
Annual events in Ukraine
Art festivals in Ukraine
Festivals established in 2007
Film festivals in Ukraine